Dark Skull is a 2016 Bolivian drama film directed by Kiro Russo. It was selected as the Bolivian entry for the Best Foreign Language Film at the 90th Academy Awards, but it was not nominated.

Plot
Elder Mamani's immaturity and recklessness make him a liability as a Huanuni tin mine, where he's filled his recently deceased father's job. Elder spirals further out of control until his fellow workers petition to have him removed.

Cast
 Narciso Choquecallata as Padrino Francisco
 Anastasia Daza López as Grandma Rosa
 Felix Espejo Espejo as Juan
 Israel Hurtado as Gallo

See also
 List of submissions to the 90th Academy Awards for Best Foreign Language Film
 List of Bolivian submissions for the Academy Award for Best Foreign Language Film

References

External links
 

2016 films
2016 drama films
2010s Spanish-language films
Bolivian drama films